The Panamericano Building is a housing construction located in the area Buceo of Montevideo, Uruguay. It is located on the coast, across the Port of Buceo and on the border with the neighbourhood of Pocitos.

It was designed and constructed by the architect Raul A. Sichero Bouret. This building stands out by the form of its supports (in V) of double height and by its facade. 

It was declared a building of "Municipal Interest" by the Mayor of Montevideo in 1995.

References

External links

Latin Union (Montevideo)
IMM Geographic Information System (Territorial Ordering)
Daily La Tribuna Popular - Trascendente experiencia en la construcción
Influencia de Francia en la Arquitectura de Uruguay (Author Cesar J. Lustau)
 Daily El País Year XCVI N ° 33413 - Suplemento Domingo - Urbanismo - Un ícono urbano cumple 55. - Montevideo, 17 de agosto de 2014.

Buildings and structures in Montevideo
Buceo
Modernist architecture in Uruguay